Joe Aska (born July 14, 1972 in Saint Croix, U.S. Virgin Islands) is a former American football running back who played for the Oakland Raiders and the Indianapolis Colts of the National Football League, as well as the New York/New Jersey Hitmen of the XFL.

High school and college career
Aska was an all-district tailback at Putnam City High School, where he also lettered in basketball and track & field. He won state titles in the 100 meters and 200 meters races. He then attended the University of Central Oklahoma. In 1994, as a junior, he led the Lone Star Conference in rushing with 1,629 yards and 15 touchdowns.  He was also a finalist for the Harlon Hill Trophy, the award given to the best football player in Division II.

National Football League career
Aska was drafted in the third round (86th overall) of the 1995 NFL Draft by the Oakland Raiders. After sitting out most of his rookie season, he played in the last game of the 1995 NFL season against the Denver Broncos. He was the primary backup to Napoleon Kaufman the following season, and started two games.  After one more season with the Raiders, he signed with the Indianapolis Colts for the 1999 season.  However, he did not see any playing time with the Colts, and was subsequently cut.  He finished his NFL career with 74 carries for 326 yards and a touchdown.  He later joined the New York/New Jersey Hitmen of the XFL.  He led the team in rushing with 329 yards on 82 carries, and posted 5 touchdowns.

External links
 Joe Aska at Pro-football-reference.com
 Joe Aska at All-XFL.com

1972 births
Living people
People from Saint Croix, U.S. Virgin Islands
American football running backs
Coffeyville Red Ravens football players
Oakland Raiders players
United States Virgin Islands players of American football
New York/New Jersey Hitmen players
Central Oklahoma Bronchos football players
Amsterdam Admirals players